Leonardo Facundo Zaragoza (born 4 June 1992) is an Argentine professional footballer who plays as a right-back for Brown de Adrogué.

Career
Zaragoza had youth spells with Almirante Brown, Independiente and Huracán, making his debut for the latter in the Copa Argentina against Excursionistas on 30 November. His Primera B Nacional bow arrived in March 2013 during a draw with Instituto, which was the first of fifteen appearances across the 2012–13, 2013–14 and 2014 seasons. Huracán won promotion to the Argentine Primera División in 2015, with Zaragoza subsequently being selected in four top-flight fixtures under manager Néstor Apuzzo. On 2 July 2015, Zaragoza joined Primera B Metropolitana side Estudiantes. Thirty-five appearances followed for them.

July 2016 saw Brown of Primera B Nacional sign Zaragoza. He made his debut in the club's home league opener versus Flandria on 3 September.

Career statistics
.

Honours
Huracán
Primera B Nacional: 2013–14

References

External links

1992 births
Living people
Sportspeople from Buenos Aires Province
Argentine footballers
Association football fullbacks
Primera Nacional players
Argentine Primera División players
Primera B Metropolitana players
Club Atlético Huracán footballers
Estudiantes de Buenos Aires footballers
Club Atlético Brown footballers
Club Atlético Temperley footballers